David Graham Lloyd (20 June 1937 – 30 May 2006) was an evolutionary biologist and the seventh New Zealander to be elected as a fellow of the Royal Society in London. He did pioneering work in the field of plant reproduction.

In December 1992, Lloyd fell victim to an apparent poisoning by acrylamide, a common laboratory chemical. As a result, he lay in a coma for three months and was left blind, mute, and quadriplegic. 
His former partner and fellow molecular biologist Vicki Calder was tried twice for his attempted murder. The first trial ended with a hung jury and the second acquitted her.

Research 

Lloyd's major contribution to botany was in the field of plant reproduction. His contributions to the field include a mechanistic treatment of different modes of self-pollination in hermaphroditic plants, a genetically defined continuum of plant gender, early development of theory of the evolution of separate sexes in plants, and with C.J. Webb, a challenge to conventional views of the evolution of heterostyly. Because of his ideas and work on population biology of plants, he is sometimes referred to as the "W.D. Hamilton in plant biology".

References

External links
New Zealand Herald obituary
Acrylamide poisoning trial
Lloyd's 1980 publication: A quantitative method for describing the gender of plants

1937 births
2006 deaths
New Zealand blind people
20th-century New Zealand botanists
New Zealand Fellows of the Royal Society
New Zealand victims of crime
People with tetraplegia
Scientists with disabilities